132nd Infantry Division may refer to:

 132nd Infantry Division (Wehrmacht)
 132nd Infantry Division (France), a French Army formation in World War I
 132nd Division (Imperial Japanese Army)
 132nd Rifle Division (Soviet Union), a Red Army formation during World War II

Military units and formations disambiguation pages